The women's 100 metre butterfly event at the 1972 Olympic Games took place between August 31 and September 1. This swimming event used the butterfly stroke. Because an Olympic size swimming pool is 50 metres long, this race consisted of two lengths of the pool.

Medalists

Results

Heats
Heat 1

Heat 2

Heat 3

Heat 4

Semifinals

Heat 1

Heat 2

Final

Key: OR = Olympic record

References

Women's butterfly 100 metre
Women's 100 metre butterfly
1972 in women's swimming
Women's events at the 1972 Summer Olympics